Bibi Zoleykhai (also Romanized as Bībī Zoleykhā’ī; also known as  Bībī Zoleykhānī, Qal‘eh-i-Mulla Qāsim, and Qal‘eh-ye Mollā Qāsem) is a village in Tayebi-ye Garmsiri-ye Jonubi Rural District, in the Central District of Kohgiluyeh County, Kohgiluyeh and Boyer-Ahmad Province, Iran. At the 2006 census, its population was 237, in 35 families.

References 

Populated places in Kohgiluyeh County